A list of notable National Hunt horse races which take place annually in Ireland, under the authority of Horse Racing Ireland, including all races which currently hold Grade 1 or Grade 2 status.

Grade 1

Grade 2

Grade 3

Selected other races

Discontinued

† Distances in miles and furlongs

References
  - Irish National Hunt May-Oct 2014.
  – Irish National Hunt Oct–Dec 2014.
  - Enhancements to the National Hunt Pattern Programme (Aug 16 2019)
  - Enhancements to the National Hunt Pattern Programme (Sep 3 2020) 

 List of Irish National Hunt races
Horse racing in Ireland
National Hunt races